DPPC can stand for:

 Disabled Persons Protection Commission at the Commonwealth of Massachusetts
 Dipalmitoylphosphatidylcholine, a phospholipid
 Disaster Prevention and Preparedness Commission of Ethiopia
 Data Privacy & Protection Counsel